Conus mucronatus, common name the deep-groved cone, is a species of sea snail, a marine gastropod mollusk in the family Conidae, the cone snails and their allies.

Like all species within the genus Conus, these snails are predatory and venomous. They are capable of "stinging" humans, therefore live ones should be handled carefully or not at all.

Subspecies
 Conus mucronatus mucronatus Reeve, 1843
 Conus mucronatus segondensis Fenzan, 2008

Description
The size of an adult shell varies between 18 mm and 50 mm. The shell is acuminately turbinated, attenuated towards the base, with revolving grooves throughout. These grooves are crossed by revolving striae. The color of the shell is whitish, somewhat clouded with pale brown. The spire is spotted with brown.

Distribution
This species occurs in the Indian Ocean off the Mascarene Basin; in the Pacific Ocean along the Philippines to Papua New Guinea, Solomon Islands, Queensland, Australia, and Vanuatu; along India and in the South China Sea.

References

 Drivas, J.; Jay, M. (1987). Coquillages de La Réunion et de l'Île Maurice. Collection Les Beautés de la Nature. Delachaux et Niestlé: Neuchâtel. . 159 pp.
 Filmer R.M. (2001). A Catalogue of Nomenclature and Taxonomy in the Living Conidae 1758 – 1998. Backhuys Publishers, Leiden. 388pp. 
 Tucker J.K. (2009). Recent cone species database. September 4, 2009 Edition
 Tucker J.K. & Tenorio M.J. (2009) Systematic classification of Recent and fossil conoidean gastropods. Hackenheim: Conchbooks. 296 pp
 Puillandre N., Duda T.F., Meyer C., Olivera B.M. & Bouchet P. (2015). One, four or 100 genera? A new classification of the cone snails. Journal of Molluscan Studies. 81: 1–23

Gallery
Below are several color forms and one subspecies:

External links
 The Conus Biodiversity website
 
 Cone Shells – Knights of the Sea

mucronatus
Gastropods described in 1843